Héctor Herrera (born 1990) is a Mexican footballer.

Héctor Herrera may also refer to:

Héctor Belo Herrera (born 1905), Uruguayan fencer
Héctor Herrera (runner) (born 1959), Cuban athlete
Héctor Herrera (photographer) (born 1934), Mexican photographer 
Héctor Herrera (silent film actor), List of Mexican films of the 1910s
Héctor Herrera (actor), Silver Ariel for best supporting actor in Lake Tahoe (film) 2008
Hector Herrera (animator), Mexican-Canadian animator best known for The Ballad of Immortal Joe